The Battle of Thiepval Ridge was the first large offensive of the Reserve Army (Lieutenant General Hubert Gough), during the Battle of the Somme on the Western Front during the First World War. The attack was intended to benefit from the Fourth Army attack in the Battle of Morval, by starting  afterwards. The battle was fought on a front from Courcelette in the east, near the Albert–Bapaume road, to Thiepval and the Schwaben Redoubt in the west, which overlooked the German defences further north in the Ancre valley, the rising ground towards Beaumont-Hamel and Serre beyond.

Thiepval Ridge was well fortified and the German defenders fought with great determination, while the British co-ordination of infantry and artillery declined after the first day, due to the confused nature of the fighting in the mazes of trenches, dugouts and shell-craters. The final British objectives were not reached until a reorganisation of the Reserve Army and the Battle of the Ancre Heights (1 October – 11 November).

Organisational difficulties and deteriorating weather frustrated General Joseph Joffre's intention to proceed with vigorous co-ordinated attacks by the Anglo-French armies, which became disjointed and declined in effectiveness during late September, at the same time as a revival occurred in the German defence. The British experimented with new techniques in gas warfare, machine-gun bombardment and tank–infantry co-operation.

The German defenders on the Somme front struggled to withstand the preponderance of men and material fielded by the Anglo–French, despite reorganisation and substantial reinforcement of troops, artillery and aircraft from Verdun. September became the month most costly in casualties for the German armies on the Somme.

Background

Tactical developments
Some debate had occurred among the Reserve Army staffs on attack tactics. The II Corps commander, Lieutenant-General Claud Jacob, advocated attacks by one line, to avoid supporting lines being caught in German counter-bombardments on the British front-line and no man's land, which usually fell  after the beginning of British attacks. Jacob considered that the supporting lines played little part in the success of the attack and merely added to casualties. Jacob also advocated afternoon attacks, since the six made by his corps had succeeded and the two dawn attacks had failed. The Reserve Army commander, Lieutenant-General Hubert Gough, was less certain but did lay stress on the supports crossing the danger zone swiftly. Gough also used the evidence of a film of an attack on 18 September, to decide against infantry advancing in groups, because of their vulnerability to artillery and because German defences in the gaps between groups were unsuppressed, allowing them to cut off the forward infantry and stop the advance of supporting groups and troops on the flanks.

Prelude

British offensive preparations

The 18th (Eastern) Division (Major-General Ivor Maxse), moved south after three weeks' battle training in the Third Army area, joining II Corps on 8 September. All company, battalion and brigade commanders reconnoitred the ground and a lecture was given by Brigadier-General Philip Howell, the II Corps Chief of Staff. Howell briefed the division on the local situation and recent experience which the unit commanders found helpful, having only been in Flanders since August. Two divisional field artilleries were attached to the division and II Corps put a battery of  howitzers and four tanks at the disposal of the divisional commander. On 21 September, the trenches south of Thiepval were taken over from the 49th (West Riding) Division and work begun to prepare them for the attack. The road from Authuille to Thiepval was repaired and hidden behind a brushwood screen, which enabled supplies to be moved up and wounded to be brought down, with little German shelling. The division arranged a stratagem, whereby the assembly and Hindenburg trenches were to be left empty after the first waves had advanced and the reserve battalion held back, to avoid the German counter-barrage. As soon as the counter-barrage stopped the troops were to advance rapidly in small columns.

British plan of attack

General Sir Douglas Haig, Commander-in-chief (C-in-C) of the British Expeditionary Force (BEF) on the Western Front, directed the Reserve Army to attack towards Achiet le Grand and the Third Army to stand ready to attack at Gommecourt as a flank guard. Three stages were set for the advance, with halts of ten minutes and one hour before the final advance. The Canadian Corps was to provide a flank guard on the right, by taking the German trenches on the spur north-west of Courcelette, the right of II Corps was to take  Redoubt  in the second stage of the advance and Stuff Redoubt at the final objective on the crest of the ridge. On the left the corps was to take Thiepval in the second stage and then reach  Redoubt, which overlooked the slope down to St Pierre Divion. It was emphasised that the Germans were to be driven off the crest, to deny the Germans observation towards Albert and gain observation over the Ancre valley. The German front line west of Thiepval was to be captured during the advance.

About  guns, howitzers and mortars with  guns and howitzers were available, the guns of V Corps north of the Ancre, being used to fire on the German river crossings and trenches on the south bank from behind. II Corps artillery was to pay special attention the demoralisation of the German garrisons of the redoubts and Thiepval village, while certain German trenches intended for the British infantry to occupy were not bombarded sufficiently for destruction. Two changes were introduced into the artillery plan, gas shell was to be fired by  mortars and the machine guns of both attacking corps, were arranged to fire overhead barrages into the gaps between the artillery barrage lines. Six of the eight tanks available were allotted to II Corps. Zero hour was set for the afternoon instead of dawn, because Maxse wanted only three hours of daylight for the consolidation on the final objective, so that most of the work would be done after dark, to avoid exposure to observed artillery fire. The Thiepval attack was to be followed by an attack astride the Ancre River. Orders for the capture of more objectives and to gain ground at every opportunity, were issued on 28 September and were intended to combine with the Fourth Army attacks planned for early October, which became known as the Battle of Le Transloy; Stuff and  redoubts were to be captured by 29 September and Stuff Trench by 1 October.

German preparations

The German front position was held by the 7th Division, 8th Division and the 26th Reserve Division, from Courcelette westwards to Thiepval. The village was garrisoned by two regiments, one attached from the 2nd Guard Reserve Division; the ground from Thiepval to St Pierre Divion was held by a regiment detached from the 52nd Division. The cellars under Thiepval Château had been extended into a complex of tunnels used as storehouses and shelters. A sunken road running up the middle of the village to the cemetery had been lined with dug-outs and in the original front-line to the west were  dug-outs.

Thiepval had been held by Württemberg Infantry Regiment 180 (WIR 180) since 1914, which still contained many pre-war trained soldiers. The regiment had not been moved and was allowed to make its own arrangements, using Bapaume as a base.  Redoubt guarded the first line between Courcelette and Thiepval,  (Stuff) and  redoubts anchored the west end of the first and second lines. Mouquet Farm to the east of Thiepval had become dangerously isolated,  beyond any support trenches, connected only by a half-demolished trench. The losses incurred in its defence weakened the garrison in the area, for little corresponding gain. Beyond the south-west of Thiepval, the original German front position ran northwards to St Pierre Divion and the Ancre. The German garrisons were alerted that an attack was imminent on 22 September and German artillery began harassing fire on British trenches and supply dumps. The British assembly for the attack early on 26 September went undisturbed.

Battle

Reserve Army

23–26 September

The preliminary bombardment began on 23 September in poor visibility and mist rose morning and evening for the next few days. II Corps fired  artillery and  artillery rounds. On the afternoon of 24 September a detachment of the Special Brigade fired  (gas) shells into Thiepval, which silenced German trench mortars by  A preliminary operation to capture Mouquet Farm began on the evening of 24 September, when a company from the 11th Division reached the farm, before a German bombardment and a bombing attack covered by accurate machine-gun fire, forced the British back.

On the right flank, the Canadian Corps attacked with the 6th Canadian Brigade of the 2nd Canadian Division on the right, as flank guard and the 1st Canadian Division on the left. At  the 6th Canadian Brigade advanced behind a creeping barrage with three battalions and two attached tanks, though a German counter-barrage kept the right-hand battalion in its trenches. Both tanks were lost early but the 29th Canadian Battalion in the centre reached the German front line in ten minutes, while the left battalion was stopped by machine-gun fire from ahead and the left flank, except for a few troops on the right. At  the objective was captured from Twenty Road, westwards to the east end of Miraumont Road and held against two counter-attacks during the night.

The 1st Canadian Division attacked with two brigades. The right brigade with two battalions advanced  to Sudbury Trench and resumed the advance at  reaching Kenora Trench on the right which ran north-west back to Regina/Stuff Trench by  The battalion on the left had been delayed; German bombers counter-attacked the flank and were repulsed. The left battalion had formed up in no man's land to escape the German counter-barrage but had a harder fight to reach their objectives, taking until mid-afternoon to reach the second objective, which was just short of the ridge crest, linking with the left brigade later. The left brigade advanced with two reinforced battalions, which received machine-gun fire from the left flank but reached  Trench, taking the western part after a delay. At  the advance resumed towards Hessian Trench, which was taken easily. Touch was gained with the right brigade but contact with the 11th Division on the left was not gained. The Canadians bombed down  Trench and built a barricade, as machine-gun fire forced a slight withdrawal from the left part of Hessian Trench, a defensive flank being thrown back from Hessian to  Trench and dug in by 

West of the Canadian Corps, II Corps attacked with the 11th and 18th (Eastern) divisions. The 11th Division advanced with two brigades. The 34th Brigade on the right attacked with two battalions; a bombing party attacking Mouquet Farm just before zero and then guarding the dugout exits. Both battalions got to the German support trench (first objective) although one of the supporting battalions was caught by the German counter-barrage at the British front-line. The right-hand battalion became bogged down fighting through  Redoubt and most of the moppers-up were killed. About  dug in on the right facing  Trench, while others sheltered to the west of the redoubt. The left battalion was caught by machine-gun fire from  Redoubt and Midway Line, which ran from Mouquet Farm to  Redoubt, north of Thiepval. A few troops reached  Trench and the remnants of the support battalion advanced to reinforce them.

The battle for Mouquet Farm continued; two attached tanks ditched nearby; the machine-guns from one tank were removed and the crew carried on as infantry. Reinforcements were sent forward (including a pioneer battalion) and at  the last  surrendered, after being attacked with smoke bombs. Touch was gained on the left with the 18th (Eastern) Division at  Trench and Midway Line was mopped up by a reserve battalion which also reinforced Hessian Trench, repelling a German counter-attack on the right.

The 18th (Eastern) Division attacked with two battalions of the 53rd Brigade on the right from Nab Valley with a battalion following-on. The plan to avoid the German counter-barrage worked and the first objective, at  Trench on the right and the Pozières–St Pierre Divion road on the left, was reached in  Two tanks advanced in support but quickly ditched as the battalions advanced again, reaching  Trench by  against slight resistance. The advance was stopped by German machine-gun fire after another  and the troops fell back to  Trench at dark and then tried to bomb forward. The 54th Brigade attacked on a narrow  front, with one battalion going through the village, a company advancing along the original German front line, with the other two battalions in support and reserve following on. The advanced troops moved forward before zero hour to avoid the German artillery and two tanks advanced from Caterpillar Copse. The advance through Thiepval went slowly, being held up by machine-gun fire from the château ruins, until a tank came up and suppressed the German machine-guns, before ditching a short time later. The infantry lost the barrage but fought on through the village until by  all but the north-west corner was captured.

27–30 September

After a German artillery bombardment on the 6th Brigade, 2nd Canadian Division all night and the morning of 27 September, patrols found that the Germans had withdrawn and the brigade advanced to the German practice trenches up Dyke Road, running north-east from Courcelette and occupied the rest of the first objective. The 1st Canadian Division was counter-attacked at Kenora Trench in the early hours and was forced back until an attack re-occupied the trench. In the II Corps area, the 11th Division found the  Redoubt empty. Trench was occupied westwards to the junction with Midway Line and eastwards to link with the Canadians. The 32nd Brigade in reserve was ordered to continue the attack at 

The attack was postponed but one of the two battalions attacked and reached the south side of Stuff Redoubt. An hour later Hessian Trench to the west was captured and at  a battalion began bombing forward from  Redoubt to the north-west. The left brigade attacked eastwards during the morning, linked with the 34th Brigade and at  the rest of Hessian Trench was occupied. The 53rd Brigade on the right of the 18th (Eastern) Division consolidated  Trench, then took part of  Trench behind a Stokes mortar barrage.

On 28 September, a cavalry patrol moved forward on the right of the 6th Brigade, 2nd Canadian Division at dawn but was quickly stopped by machine-gun fire. The brigade dug in facing north-east beyond the German practice trenches and a battalion advanced north up Courcelette Trench, meeting much German machine-gun fire from Regina Trench. During the night, the four Canadian brigades engaged were relieved by the 4th and 8th brigades. In II Corps the 32nd Brigade took over on the right of the 11th Division, ready to take Stuff Redoubt and Hessian Trench at  but the attack was delayed. A bombing attack into the rest of Stuff Redoubt gained ground but this was later abandoned.

Bulgar Trench was taken quickly but the Germans in Midway Line held out longer. By  the east end of  Redoubt was approached and touch was gained on the right with the 11th Division. Troops later reached the south-west corner of the redoubt and by  the south side of the redoubt had been captured and linked with the troops in Midway Line to the right, as the left gained touch with mixed groups from the 54th Brigade. Grenade skirmishes occurred intermittently during the night and a battalion from the 55th Brigade took over the front of the 54th Brigade.

On 29 September, the 8th Brigade from the 3rd Canadian Division attacked at noon with the 11th Division on the left and reached Hessian Trench in places, which were lost and then regained during German shelling and counter-attacks. In the II Corps area, the 11th Division attacked Stuff Redoubt and Hessian Trench to the right, most of which were captured and touch gained with the Canadians, while the attack on the redoubt failed. After battalion reliefs in the 18th (Eastern) Division, a bombing fight began around  along the western edge of  Redoubt, which lasted all day; the ground gained could not be held and the battalion later relieved troops in the captured German front system. Canadian bombers assisted the capture of Hessian Trench and the division was relieved by the 25th Division overnight. A dawn counter-attack drove the 18th (Eastern) Division from the south and west sides of  Redoubt; the south side was recaptured and the north side of the redoubt was taken at  Another German attack at  retook the north face, up to the entrance to Stuff Trench on the right.

Air operations

4 Squadron and 7 Squadron made a number of low reconnaissance flights to observe the condition of the German wire and trenches before the attack. GHQ Wing and Corps squadron air observers on contact patrol, watched the infantry advance behind the creeping barrage and enter Thiepval with two tanks, which prompted some German soldiers to run away. At  British troops were photographed in Hessian Trench and air observers were able to report the capture of Thiepval, save for the north-west corner. Ground observers were able to engage six German batteries, while air observation allowed another  be bombarded. South of Miraumont a 4 Squadron air observer reported  German troops on the road, who were scattered by British heavy artillery. The squadrons of IV and V Brigades dropped a hundred and thirty-five 20-pound bombs on trenches, artillery and billets as III Brigade bombed Lagnicourt aerodrome despite poor visibility and attacked German kite balloons, 60 Squadron Nieuports shooting down two with Le Prieur rockets and bombing grounded balloons with phosphorus bombs. 19 Squadron attacked a German divisional headquarters at Barastre with  bombs. Two German aircraft were shot down and four damaged for the loss of one British aircraft over Bapaume but the faster German machines were able to avoid contact at will.

Next day British offensive patrols met numerous German formations in the morning, before heavy rain interrupted flying. Six aircraft of 27 Squadron were attacked by five Albatros D.I of  led by Oswald Boelcke, which shot down three and damaged one of the Martinsydes. Another British aircraft was lost on an early morning railway reconnaissance by 70 Squadron. On 28 September V Brigade aircraft reported the British advances at  Redoubt and directed artillery fire on  pits and blew up nine ammunition stores. Few German aircraft appeared but two were shot down and two damaged, one of the aircraft being shot down by a new Spad S.VII, flown by a pilot of 60 Squadron. Poor weather grounded most aircraft on 29 September but next day was clear,  photographs were obtained and low reconnaissance observed the state of German trenches and wire. With the capture of Stuff Redoubt and most of  Redoubt, the denial of air observation to the Germans became more important and eleven aircraft raided Lagnicourt aerodrome again, escorted by 11 Squadron and 60 Squadron. Many German aircraft were able to take off and attack the British aircraft as they returned, three German aircraft being shot down and one damaged for a loss of one F.E. 2b.

German 1st Army

The 7th Division near Courcelette had all three regiments forward, with a battalion each in the front, support and reserve lines. The front trenches next to the Albert–Bapaume road were lost quickly, while Infantry Regiment 72 (IR 72) in the centre held its ground and the right-hand regiment was pushed back slowly, having managed to ambush the Canadians by occupying  (Fabeck Trench) in no man's land, which the British artillery planners had ignored, thinking that it was derelict. The Germans were quickly outflanked and the fifty survivors surrendered at  The Canadians pressed forward on both flanks and quickly overran  (Zollern Trench).

A Canadian attack was repulsed and a second attempt at midnight was stopped with the help of reinforcements.

The defence of IR 153 on the outskirts of Thiepval collapsed when three tanks appeared, proving to be immune to machine-gun fire and hand-grenades.

The German defence on either side was outflanked, on the left Mouquet Farm was surrounded (and held out until ).  was captured, IR 165 to the left being forced back along . The Germans in  Redoubt held on, helped by an accurate counter-barrage falling  beyond. A British artillery battery which tried to unlimber  to the south-west, was knocked out with machine-gun fire. During the night  was made the first line and ground still occupied in front of it was to be held by advanced posts.

Infantry Regiment 180 (IR 180) of the 26th Reserve Division held Thiepval with part of Reserve Infantry Regiment 77;  Redoubt and the old front line north-west to St Pierre Divion were held by Infantry Regiment 66. The digging of British assembly trenches was seen before the attack, alerting the defenders and the first two waves of British infantry were shot down. A tank appeared from Authuille Wood leading a third wave, which collected survivors of the first two and came close to the German position, just as IR 180 companies on the south and west sides of the Thiepval defences, were attacked from behind by British bombers moving west. Some British troops reached  (Bulgar Trench) behind Thiepval, where the support companies managed to stop the British moving further west. In  the British had also reached  and probed beyond . At  a carrier pigeon arrived at the 26th Reserve Division headquarters, with a message that eighteen men were left in the I Battalion dug-out.

French operations
Careful planning for the combined attack at Morval was necessary, due to the French Sixth Army advance diverging east and north-east. The new attack northwards to keep touch with the British, needed reinforcements of troops and artillery, which were taken from the Tenth Army further south. Artillery and aircraft were brought from Verdun and XXXII Corps took over on the right of I Corps. The Sixth Army was to advance  close to the line Moislains–Le Transloy. Foch intervened on 25 September, to ensure that I Corps and XXXII Corps attacked north to Sailly-Saillisel, with V Corps as right flank guard. The big attacks on the afternoons of  September took little ground in the face of very heavy German artillery fire. Fayolle concluded that an extensive artillery preparation would be needed before resuming the attack.

Aftermath

Analysis
German accounts of the battle conclude that the break-ins north-west of Courcelette and just east of Thiepval led to the defeat. Lack of reserves forced the 7th Division to retreat in the east and the success of the British 11th Division allowed Thiepval to be outflanked from the right, with the loss of the village and most of the garrison, the British advancing  on the  front attacked. The British pushed on in the next few days towards Stuff and  redoubts, where the Germans were eventually dislodged in the Battle of the Ancre Heights, which began on 1 October. Apart from here and at Sailly-Saillisel in the French Sixth Army area, Bazentin ridge had been captured, giving ground observation of the upper Ancre river and the spurs and valleys on the north bank.

Casualties

Subsequent operations

British operations concluded on 30 September, with the capture of a large portion of the  Redoubt, north of Thiepval, another first day objective which had been attacked by the 36th (Ulster) Division. In the Battle of the Ancre Heights, which began on 1 October, the final objectives of the Battle of Thiepval were reached; on 14 October the rest of  Redoubt was captured and the Canadian Corps completed the capture of Regina Trench on 11 November.

Commemoration

Because of the significance that the positions at Thiepval as a first-day objective, which was not captured until almost three months later, the high ground on the point of the Thiepval Spur was selected to be the location of the Anglo-French memorial to the "missing of the Somme". The Thiepval Memorial to the Missing of the Somme is dedicated to the men who were killed and whose bodies were never recovered, during the fighting in the vicinity from 1916 to 1918. The piers of the memorial bear the names of over  soldiers, who were killed on the Somme battlefields "but to whom the fortunes of war denied the known and honoured burial given to their comrades in death".

See also

 List of Canadian battles during World War I
 Ulster Tower Thiepval

Notes

Footnotes

References

Further reading
  Translation of Meine Tätigkeit im Weltkriege 1914–1918 (Berlin, Verlag Ernst Siegfried Mittler und Sohn 1939)

External links

 Thiepval Memorial FirstWorldWar.com
 Thiepval Memorial to the Missing at greatwar.co.uk
 Thiepval Memorial at webmatters.net
 Battle of Thiepval Ridge, 26–30 September 1916 at historyofwar.org

Thiepval Ridge
Thiepval Ridge
Thiepval Ridge
Thiepval Ridge
Thiepval Ridge
Thiepval Ridge
1916 in France
Thiepval Ridge
September 1916 events